Nyerere Bridge (also: Kigamboni Bridge) is a 680-meter-long bridge in Tanzania that connects the Dar es Salaam ward of Kurasini from the east to the west of Kigamboni district across the Kurasini estuary. Construction work began in February 2012 and  completed in April 2016. The completion of the bridge has offered an alternative transport link to the new district of Kigamboni. Previously, the Kivukoni ferry provided a quick transport link between south east of the Dar es Salaam Central Business District specifically from south east of Kivukoni to north west of Kigamboni. The bridge has six lanes (three on each direction) and two pedestrians/cyclists lanes with width of 2.5 meters (one on each side). Construction of 2.5 km approach roads were completed with 1 km on the Kurasini side and 1.5 km on the Kigamboni side. The road joins the Nelson Mandela expressway through elevated free interchange to separate traffic approaching and leaving the junction. There is a toll plaza for controlling and charging of vehicles passing through the bridge. A total of 14 controlled lanes are going to be in this area (seven for each of the two directions).

References

External links
 Artist's Impressions

Cable-stayed bridges in Tanzania
Buildings and structures under construction in Tanzania